Okenia pellucida is a species of sea slug, specifically a dorid nudibranch, a marine gastropod mollusc in the family Goniodorididae.

Distribution
This species was described from south-eastern Australia. It is known from the United Arab Emirates, India, Malaysia, New Zealand, Palmyra Atoll and Japan.

Description
This Okenia has a narrow body and eleven or twelve pairs of short lateral papillae. There are a few papillae on the back, between the rhinophores and the gills. The body is translucent and covered with a reticulate pattern of brown lines. It is similar in shape and arrangement of the papillae to Okenia angelensis, Okenia zoobotryon and Okenia distincta.

Ecology
The diet of this species is a bryozoan, Amathia verticillata which is a common fouling organism which is transported on ships' hulls.

References

Goniodorididae
Gastropods described in 1967